The El Paraiso Open was a golf tournament on the European Tour in 1974. It was held at El Paraiso Golf Club in Marbella, Spain. It was won by England's Peter Oosterhuis, who defeated Manuel Ballesteros scoring a birdie 4 at the first hole of a sudden-death playoff and winning the first prize of £3,000. Because of lightning, the second round was not completed until the third day and the tournament was reduced to 54 holes with 18 holes on the final day.

Winners

Notes

References

External links
Coverage on the European Tour's official site

Former European Tour events
Golf tournaments in Spain